The paulista general, also called southern general and tupi austral, is a lingua franca and creole language formed in the 16th century, in the Captaincy of São Vicente. Today it is only of historical interest, as it has been a dead language since the beginning of the 20th century. It constituted the southern branch of the Língua Geral.

With influence on Brazilian toponymy, the Paulista language bequeathed many current Brazilian toponyms, such as: Aricanduva, Baquirivu-Guaçu, Batovi, Batuquara, Bicuíba, Biriricas, etc.

In 2014, during research at the University of Campinas, a new source of studies for the language was identified. The document, entitled Vocabulário Elementar da Língua Geral Brasílica (Elementary Vocabulary of the General Brasílica Language), was published in 1936 in the Journal of the Municipal Archive of São Paulo. Although the title mentions the Brasílica language (ancient Tupi), the vocabulary written by José Joaquim Machado de Oliveira is effectively one of the sources for the Paulista language.

History 
In the history of Brazil, the Portuguese colonization officially began with the foundation of the Captaincy of São Vicente by the Portuguese nobleman Martim Afonso de Sousa, on January 22, 1532. When Martim Afonso arrived in São Vicente, he met a group of Portuguese, Spanish and Indigenous convicts, led by the Portuguese João Ramalho. The figure of João Ramalho was extremely important for the success of the Portuguese colonization in the region. Ramalho acted as an intermediary in the negotiations between the Tupi Indians and the Portuguese colonizers. He had a close relationship with the natives of the region, was married to Bartira, daughter of the chief Tibiriçá, and was already established among the Tupi since 1508.

With the officialisation of Portuguese colonisation in 1532, the union between white men and indigenous women became frequent, as the scarcity of white women on the Piratininga Plateau meant that, from the early days, the white inhabitant sought out the Indian in legitimate or temporary and multiple unions. The Indian leaders, with the intention of establishing stable alliances with foreigners who had many new and desirable material goods, initially supported this type of interethnic union. The population of the coastal regions of São Vicente, Piratininga and Alto Tietê, at the time of colonization, was made up almost entirely of Guayanás, Tupis and Carijós, speakers of the Tupi language.

The scarcity or total absence of white women in the region can be explained by the fact that the first groups of settlers who disembarked in the Capitania of São Vicente were exclusively composed of men, many of them convicts or castaways. Only five years after the foundation of the captaincy, the first Portuguese couple disembarked in São Vicente.

The interethnic unions, however, were not interrupted with the arrival of this and other couples and the coming of Portuguese wives. What predominated in the region in the first decades of colonisation was the union between white men and Tupi women. In this context, the caboclo emerged in the region, whose mother tongue was the Tupi of the mothers and also of all the relatives, since on the father's side there were no consanguineous relatives. This situation lasted for a long time and the Tupi language prevailed among the Paulista population in the first centuries of Portuguese colonisation.

Gradually, the Tupi of São Paulo ceased to constitute an independent and culturally diverse people and their language began to reproduce itself essentially as the language of the caboclos. The language spoken by this caboclo population gradually became different from the genuine Tupi. In the 17th and 18th centuries, this language, already widespread among the Paulista population, became known as the "Paulista general language".

Bandeiras 
The beginning of the bandeiras era, of mining and Indian preaching, in the 17th century, contributed to the maternal influence in the culture and language of the paulista population. Men and their children would go out on long expeditions for gold prospecting and mining, leaving their young children in the care of their mothers, who were mostly Tupi speakers. In this context, the paulista children, in their first years of life, were exposed exclusively to the Tupi language, having contact with the Paulista language only at the beginning of their adult life. The predominance of the Paulista language in the Bandeiras was almost total, thus, the range of the Paulista language was largely extended by the actions of the Bandeirantes in the 17th and 18th centuries. The Paulista language was spoken and taken by the bandeirantes from São Paulo to places corresponding to the present states of Minas Gerais, Goiás, Mato Grosso, Mato Grosso do Sul and Paraná.

Spanish and Guaraní influences 
In the early 17th century, the Paulista Bandeirantes began a series of raids against the Spanish Jesuit missions in search of Guarani slaves to work in Paulista lands. The contact established during this period of wars between Paulistas and Spaniards brought elements of both the Spanish language and Guarani into the Paulista language. Besides the times of war, the slavery of Guaraní people, brought from Guayrá (now Paraná) and Tapes (now Rio Grande do Sul) and Carijós from Santa Catarina brought influences to the Paulista language when they were taken to the region of São Vicente. However, it is believed that because it expanded through the bandeirantes, the paulista language probably presents a greater influence of the Portuguese language.

Other general languages 
Among the other general languages of Brazil, Paulista is closer to Guarani than to Nheengatu.

19th and 20th century 
In the 19th century, even with the intense dissemination of the Portuguese language among the Paulista population, it was still possible to hear, albeit sporadically and only in the older generation, the Paulista language. In 1853, the politician and historian José Inocêncio Alves Alvim, says, having consulted some old men who still remember indigenous words of the Paulista language. We can infer from Alves Alvim's statement that in 1853, in the surroundings of the city of Iguape, the Paulista language, although it was no longer common among the population of the region, was still present in the memory of the older generation. In Curitiba, words from the paulista language were also used, sometimes accompanied by the Portuguese language, as António de Alcântara Machado describes, referring to the paulista term "Ahiva" (English: bad):

Travelling to the sources of the São Francisco River and the Goiás Province, Augustin Saint-Hilaire presents 48 paulista words, collected by him at the beginning of the 19th century in zambo communities in the Minas Gerais Province.

Currently

Disappearance 
At the end of the 18th century the Portuguese crown, under the management of Sebastião José de Carvalho e Melo, Marquis of Pombal, banned the use of the Paulista language, severely punishing those who used it, imposing, from then on, the Portuguese language in Brazil, to ensure Portugal's unity and identity as a nation, bringing the idea of a homogeneous and stable language. However, few people from the colony could attend schools, which leads to the reasoning that, in homes, informal meetings, and in everyday life, the Paulista language continued to be spoken normally, only disappearing completely at the beginning of the 20th century, with the great wave of European migration. While in the capitals this language had fallen into disuse, in the interior it was still alive, and there are hypotheses that the Paulista language gave origin to the caipira dialect, spoken in the caipira cultural belt, known as Paulistania.

Records 
The main known document of the Paulista language is the Dicionário de Verbos, undated and of unknown author, compiled and published by Carl Friedrich Philipp von Martius in his Glossaria linguarum brasiliensium, under the name of "Tupi austral". This document was given to Martius by Ferdinand Denis, an important French historian and bibliographer who lived in the Kingdom of Brazil from 1816 to 1821. Besides the documents mentioned above, there is also a statement by Couto de Magalhães, in the introduction to the Avá-Canoeiro vocabulary, in which the author states that many of the names contained in the vocabulary are currently current among the paulistas of the people, called caipira. There were still, in the mid-nineteenth century, several expressions of the Paulista language in the discourse of the caipira people of São Paulo Province.

See also
Língua Geral

External links 
As Línguas Gerais
Vocabulário da Língua Geral Paulista. Língua falada no séc. XVII em São Paulo, Cuiabá e Rio Grande do Sul

References 

Extinct languages of South America
Tupi–Guarani languages
Languages attested from the 17th century
Languages extinct in the 18th century